This article describes the history of cricket in Pakistan from the 1970–71 season to 1984–85.

Events
In 1970, the Ayub Trophy was rebranded as the BCCP Trophy and converted from a knockout tournament to a mini-league  format whereby teams qualified for a semi-final stage by winning one of four qualifying groups.  The competition's name changed again in 1973 to BCCP Patron's Trophy.  

The Pentangular Trophy commenced in the 1973–74 season and the Wills Cup, Pakistan's premier limited overs competition, in 1980–81.

National championships
Winners of the Quaid-i-Azam Trophy from 1971 to 1985 were:
 1970–71 – Karachi Blues
 1971–72 – no competition
 1972–73 – Railways
 1973–74 – Railways
 1974–75 – Punjab A
 1975–76 – National Bank
 1976–77 – United Bank
 1977–78 – Habib Bank
 1978–79 – National Bank
 1979–80 – PIA
 1980–81 – United Bank
 1981–82 – National Bank
 1982–83 – United Bank
 1983–84 – National Bank
 1984–85 – United Bank

Winners of the BCCP (Patron's) Trophy from 1971 to 1985 were:
 1970–71 – PIA
 1971–72 – PIA
 1972–73 – Karachi Blues
 1973–74 – Railways
 1974–75 – National Bank
 1975–76 – National Bank
 1976–77 – Habib Bank
 1977–78 – Habib Bank
 1978–79 – National Bank
 1979–80 – IDBP
 1980–81 – Rawalpindi
 1981–82 – Allied Bank
 1982–83 – PACO
 1983–84 – Karachi Blues
 1984–85 – Karachi Whites

Winners of the Pentangular Trophy from 1974 to 1985 were:
 1973–74 – PIA
 1974–75 – National Bank
 1975–76 – PIA
 1977–78 – Habib Bank
 1978–79 – Habib Bank and PIA shared trophy
 1979–80 – PIA
 1980–81 – PIA
 1981–82 – Habib Bank
 1982–83 – Habib Bank
 1983–84 – United Bank
 1984–85 – PACO

Winners of the Wills Cup from 1981 to 1985 were:
 1980–81 – PIA
 1981–82 – PIA
 1982–83 – PIA
 1983–84 – Habib Bank
 1984–85 – no competition

Leading players by season

Batsmen
Javed Miandad

Imran Khan

Bowlers
Imran Khan

Aaqib Javed

International tours of Pakistan

Rest of the World 1970–71

England 1972–73
 1st Test at Gaddafi Stadium, Lahore – match drawn		
 2nd Test at Niaz Stadium, Hyderabad – match drawn		
 3rd Test at National Stadium, Karachi – match drawn

Rest of the World 1973–74

Sri Lanka 1973–74

West Indies 1974–75
 1st Test at Gaddafi Stadium, Lahore – match drawn		
 2nd Test at National Stadium, Karachi – match drawn

International XI 1976–77

New Zealand 1976–77
 1st Test at Gaddafi Stadium, Lahore – Pakistan won by 6 wickets	
 2nd Test at Niaz Stadium, Hyderabad – Pakistan won by 10 wickets	
 3rd Test at National Stadium, Karachi – match drawn

England 1977–78
 1st Test at Gaddafi Stadium, Lahore – match drawn		
 2nd Test at Niaz Stadium, Hyderabad – match drawn		
 3rd Test at National Stadium, Karachi – match drawn

India 1978–79
 1st Test at Iqbal Stadium, Faisalabad – match drawn		
 2nd Test at Gaddafi Stadium, Lahore – Pakistan won by 8 wickets	
 3rd Test at National Stadium, Karachi – Pakistan won by 8 wickets

Australia 1979–80
 1st Test at National Stadium, Karachi – Pakistan won by 7 wickets	
 2nd Test at Iqbal Stadium, Faisalabad – match drawn		
 3rd Test at Gaddafi Stadium, Lahore – match drawn

West Indies 1980–81
 1st Test at Gaddafi Stadium, Lahore – match drawn		
 2nd Test at Iqbal Stadium, Faisalabad – West Indies won by 156 runs	
 3rd Test at National Stadium, Karachi – match drawn		
 4th Test at Ibn-e-Qasim Bagh Stadium, Multan – match drawn

International XI 1981–82

Sri Lanka 1981–82
 1st Test at National Stadium, Karachi – Pakistan won by 204 runs	
 2nd Test at Iqbal Stadium, Faisalabad – match drawn		
 3rd Test at Gaddafi Stadium, Lahore – Pakistan won by an innings and 102 runs

Australia 1982–83
 1st Test at National Stadium, Karachi – Pakistan won by 9 wickets	
 2nd Test at Iqbal Stadium, Faisalabad – Pakistan won by an innings and 3 runs	
 3rd Test at Gaddafi Stadium, Lahore – Pakistan won by 9 wickets

In a supplementary One Day International series, Pakistan won the first two matches by 59 runs and 28 runs respectively, there being no result in a third match due to bad weather.

Australia also played three first-class matches against BCCP Patron's XI at the Pindi Club Ground, Rawalpindi; BCCP XI at the Ibn-e-Qasim Bagh Stadium, Multan; and Pakistan Invitation XI at the Jinnah Stadium, Sialkot.  Australia won the first two matches and drew the third.

India 1982–83
 1st Test at Gaddafi Stadium, Lahore – match drawn		
 2nd Test at National Stadium, Karachi – Pakistan won by an innings and 86 runs	
 3rd Test at Iqbal Stadium, Faisalabad – Pakistan won by 10 wickets	
 4th Test at Niaz Stadium, Hyderabad – Pakistan won by an innings and 119 runs	
 5th Test at Gaddafi Stadium, Lahore – match drawn		
 6th Test at National Stadium, Karachi – match drawn

England 1983–84
 1st Test at National Stadium, Karachi – Pakistan won by 3 wickets	
 2nd Test at Iqbal Stadium, Faisalabad – match drawn		
 3rd Test at Gaddafi Stadium, Lahore – match drawn

India 1984–85
 1st Test at Gaddafi Stadium, Lahore – match drawn		
 2nd Test at Iqbal Stadium, Faisalabad – match drawn		
 3rd Test at National Stadium, Karachi – game abandoned; no toss was made; the game and the rest of the tour were cancelled due to the assassination of Mrs Indira Gandhi

New Zealand 1984–85
 1st Test at Gaddafi Stadium, Lahore – Pakistan won by 6 wickets	
 2nd Test at Niaz Stadium, Hyderabad – Pakistan won by 7 wickets	
 3rd Test at National Stadium, Karachi – match drawn

Bibliography
 First Class Cricket in Pakistan (5 volumes) by Abid Ali Kazi
 Playfair Cricket Annual
 Wisden Cricketers Almanack

External sources
 CricketArchive – List of Tournaments in Pakistan

1985